In Australian rules football, a player can score a goal by kicking the oval ball between the two central goal posts. 298 players are recognised to have scored a goal with their first kick in the sport's premier competition, the Australian Football League (AFL), known before 1990 as the Victorian Football League (VFL). These players are often said to have joined an "elite" and "exclusive" club.

Rarer still are players who have scored goals from their first two kicks – a mere 40 of these players have been recorded. Of these players, just ten have also scored a goal with their third kick. Clen Denning (debuted 1935), Richard Lounder (1989) and Daniel Metropolis (1992) are the only VFL/AFL players documented to have scored four goals from as many kicks. Denning followed up with goals from his fifth and sixth kicks, an effort that remains unmatched.

On occasion, players have mistakenly been omitted from – and included in – the AFL's official records of the accomplishment. For example, Melbourne's Dave McGlashan scored a goal with his first kick during the 1981 VFL season. However, his achievement was not recognised until 2010, when he was prompted to come forward after the club's website published an article examining Melbourne players who accomplished the feat. In a contrasting event in 2002, Essendon's Shane Harvey was briefly recognised to have scored goals with his first two kicks, before an Essendon fan pointed out Harvey had in fact kicked a clearing ball just a few seconds into his debut, prior to his first goal.

Goal with first kick

Multiple goals with first kicks

Notes

References 

Goal with first kick
History of Australian rules football
VFL/AFL players